Morris Stephen Panych (born 30 June 1952) is a Canadian playwright, director and actor.

Early life
Panych was born in Calgary, Alberta and grew up in Edmonton, Alberta. He studied at Northern Alberta Institute of Technology, and the University of British Columbia.

Plays
Co$t of Living (1991)
The Ends of the Earth (1994)
Vigil (1996) (adapted for the British stage as Auntie and Me)

Vigil played at the Belfry Theatre in Victoria, BC (15 November - 11 December 2022) and Panych is described on the playbill as one of Canada's "most prolific and idiosyncratic playwrights -- and one of the very best.  I love his plays -- and his characters.  So many of them approach the world with disdain and skepticism.  But despite their best efforts -- they can't help finding the good in other people."  This work is best described as a very funny black comedy.

Lawrence & Holloman
Girl in the Goldfish Bowl (2003)
Earshot
7 Stories
Dishwashers
Still Laughing: Three Adaptations by Morris Panych (2009), Panych's adaptations of: 
The Government Inspector by Nikolai Gogol
Hotel Peccadillo by Georges Feydeau and Mauric Desvallières
The Amorous Adventures of Anatol by Arthur Schnitzler
The Trespassers (2010)
Gordon (2011)
In Absentia (2012)
The Shoplifters (2014)
Sextet (2014)
The Waiting Room (2015)

He has directed nearly one hundred theatre and opera productions, including most of his own works, and the Prix Italia nominated The Overcoat, plus several music videos and Da Vinci's Inquest. He won the 1994 Governor General's Award for Drama for The Ends of the Earth, and the 2004 Governor General's Award for Drama for Girl in the Goldfish Bowl.

In 2020 he created and wrote the web series Hey Lady!, starring Jayne Eastwood, for CBC Gem.

Personal life
Openly gay, Panych married his longtime partner, Ken MacDonald, in 2004.

References

External links 
 
 Canadian Theatre Encyclopedia entry
 kenandmorris.com Morris Panych and Ken MacDonald

1952 births
20th-century Canadian dramatists and playwrights
21st-century Canadian dramatists and playwrights
Governor General's Award-winning dramatists
Living people
Canadian gay writers
Male actors from Calgary
Male actors from Edmonton
Writers from Calgary
Writers from Edmonton
Canadian LGBT dramatists and playwrights
Canadian male dramatists and playwrights
Canadian music video directors
20th-century Canadian male writers
21st-century Canadian male writers
Gay dramatists and playwrights
21st-century Canadian LGBT people
20th-century Canadian LGBT people